Dunlop is a brand of tyre originally produced by the Dunlop Pneumatic Tyre Company from the end of the 19th century, taking its name from John Boyd Dunlop. The brand is used for many other products made from rubber or with rubber components and some with a looser connection to rubber.

Ownership of the brand has become fragmented over the years. Three main events contributed to this fragmentation: 	

 in 1899, the Dunlop company sold its Australian branch. As a result, Dunlop Australia acquired the rights to the brand in Australia.
 in 1985, Dunlop Rubber sold the rights to the Dunlop brand of automobile tyre, following several bad business decisions, including a disastrous joint venture with Pirelli where Dunlop unwittingly took responsibility for significant debts.
 between 1996 and 1998, BTR plc (which acquired Dunlop Rubber in 1985) sold a number of companies which used the Dunlop brand for their products.

Dunlop brands 
The Dunlop brand and logo is largely reunified under the ownership of Sumitomo Rubber Industries. Various companies market products with the "flying D" logo or incorporate the word Dunlop in their trading name.

Automobile 
 Dunlop Tyres and Dunlop Tires:
 owned in Australia, Europe, New Zealand, and North America by Goodyear (the result of dissolvement of global joint venture with Sumitomo Rubber Industries in 2015)
 Motorcycle tyre rights in North America owned by Sumitomo Rubber Industries (the result of dissolvement of global joint venture with Goodyear)
 owned by Sumitomo in Asia (the result of the acquisition from Dunlop Rubber in 1985), with the exception of Malaysia, Singapore & Brunei, where the brand is owned by Continental AG
 owned by Sumitomo in Africa (the result of an acquisition in 2013 from Apollo Tyres of India, which had acquired the brand rights from BTR in 1998)
owned in India by the Ruia Group (the result of the sale of Dunlop India in 1984 to the Jumbo Group, which sold it on in 2005).
 Dunlop Garage Equipment, a subsidiary garage equipment manufacturer, owned by Gemco, supplying vehicle servicing equipment for cars and commercial vehicles, based in Mytholmroyd, England.

Aerospace 
 Dunlop Aircraft Tyres, a company in Birmingham, England (sold by BTR in 1996; 75% of stack was sold to AAC Capital Partners. AAC sold company to Liberty Hall Capital Partners for $135 Million).
 Dunlop Aerospace, including Dunlop Equipment and Dunlop Precision Rubber, owned by Meggitt plc (the result of a sale by BTR in 1998)

Construction materials 
 Dunlop Adhesives, a brand of tile adhesive and grouting, owned by Ardex GmbH (the result of a sale by BTR in 1996)
 Dunlop Industries of Kenya, who produce PVC floor tiles (sold by BTR in 1996)
 Ardit Floor Leveler (cement based) for concrete or timber floors, to apply tiles, carpet or vinyl flooring.

Footwear 
 Dunlop Protective Footwear, a brand of waterproof footwear and safety boots, owned by the Dutch company Hevea, which acquired the brand in 1996.

In the US and Canada, the rights to the Dunlop brand is now owned by SRI Sports, part of Sumitomo Rubber Industries.

Furniture 
 Dunlopillo, a brand of mattress and latex foam for furniture, owned in the UK by Steinhoff International, acquired in 2013 from Hilding Anders, which owns the brand in Scandinavia. Elsewhere it was owned by Dunlop Latex Foam Ltd (sold by BTR in 1997) and now by several companies including the Pikolin group. They are also operating in Asian countries like Malaysia, China, Hong Kong, Singapore and Vietnam.

Industrial products 
 Dunlop Conveyor Belting, part of Fenner Dunlop Conveyor Belting Worldwide, providing a range of conveyor belt systems. On March 19, 2018, Fenner PLC, the parent company of the 'Dunlop' and 'Fenner Dunlop' brands in the industrial and mining sector, was acquired by Compagnie Générale des Établissements Michelin, commonly known in the North America as The Michelin Group.
 Dunlop Extrusions, a brand of rubber extrusions owned by an independent company in Manchester, England
 Dunlop Fabrications, a brand of flexible fuel and water tanks owned by Trelleborg AB of Sweden
 Dunlop Hiflex, a brand of hydraulic hoses and pipes
 Dunlop Oil & Marine, a brand of rubber hose for marine use, owned by Continental AG of Germany
 Dunlop Rubber Mouldings, owned by Dunlop Industrial Products, a South African company sold by BTR in 1998
 Dunlop Systems & Components, an independent company borne of a management buyout from Trelleborg AB in 2007, who in turn had purchased the business as part of a suite of companies from BTR Seibe (which subsequently became Invensys - Until recently they owned a substantial historical catalogue of Trademark rights pertaining to use of the Dunlop/D Device in the manufacturing arena). Based in Coventry, England, manufacturing rubber full air struts, air springs, and bellows, ECAS (ElecronicallyControlled Air Suspension) air suspension components such as compressors and valve blocks and also owning the rights to automotive anti-vibration systems.

Sports equipment 
 Dunlop Sport, a brand of golf and tennis equipment, sporting footwear and other products
 Owned by SRI Sports (a subsidiary of Sumitomo) worldwide after acquisition of Dunlop Sport brand in most countries from Sports Direct. SRI Sports already owned Dunlop Sport in Korea, Japan, and Taiwan prior to its acquisition of Dunlop Sport International.

References

External links 

 Dunlop Sports
 Dunlop Tires
 Dunlopillo Singapore

Lists of brands by company
Scottish brands